A Bandit is a 1913 American short comedy film featuring Fatty Arbuckle. A print of the film survives.

Cast
 Roscoe 'Fatty' Arbuckle
 Nick Cogley
 Ford Sterling as The Bandit
 Al St. John

See also
 List of American films of 1913
 Fatty Arbuckle filmography

References

External links

 A Bandit on YouTube

1913 films
Silent American comedy films
American silent short films
1913 comedy films
1913 short films
American black-and-white films
Films directed by Mack Sennett
American comedy short films
1910s American films